Christina Milian Turned Up is an American reality documentary television series on E! that premiered on January 18, 2015. E! announced the series in September 2014 as a "docu soap [that] follows singer and actress Christina Milian’s career, love life, and her relationship with her Cuban-American family." However, Milian stated the series will not feature her love life, including no appearances by rumoured boyfriend Lil Wayne.

In April 2015, E! renewed the show for a second season, which premiered on November 3, 2015.

On September 21, 2016, Milian confirmed on her Snapchat that E! declined to pick up a third season.

Episodes

Season 1 (2015)

Season 2 (2015–16)

Broadcast
The series premiered in the United States on E! on January 18, 2015 with a double episode at 10pm. The series premiered in Australia on the local version of E! on January 27, 2015.

References

External links 
 
 

2015 American television series debuts
E! original programming
English-language television shows